Raoul Petretta (born 24 March 1997) is a professional footballer who plays as a defender for Toronto FC in Major League Soccer. Born in Germany, he has represented Italy at youth level.

Early life
Petretta began playing football with SC Rheinfelden 03. After three years, he joined Swiss club FC Basel at age six. He spent the remainder of his youth career with Basel, progressing from the U7 level to the U21 level, before joining the first team.

Club career
He began his senior career with Basel II in the third tier Swiss Promotion League. He scored his first goal on 29 October 2016 against FC United Zürich.

In February 2017, he signed a professional contract with FC Basel. He made his professional debut for FC Basel on February 4, 2017 against FC Lugano in a Swiss Super League match. He made his UEFA Champions League debut on September 27, 2017 against Portuguese club Benfica. On 14 October 2017, he scored his first goal against FC Lugano. In December 2020, he suffered a spinal cord injury during a match, but was able to avoid serioud injury. On 15 May 2021 he scored a brace against FC Zurich. During his time with Basel, Petretta played in the UEFA Champions League, UEFA Europa League and UEFA Conference League and won the Swiss Super League in 2016-17 and the Swiss Cup twice in 2016-17 and 2018-19. In May 2022, it was announced that he would depart Basel upon the expiry of his contract, after rejecting a contract extension.

In July 2022, Petretta signed with Turkish Süper Lig club Kasımpaşa. He made his debut on 8 August 2022 against İstanbul Başakşehir. He departed the club in January 2023. 

In January 2023, Petretta joined Major League Soccer side Toronto FC on a contract through 2025, with an option for 2026.

International career
Born in Germany to Italian parents, Petretta does not hold German citizenship. On 25 May 2018, he made his debut with the Italy U21 team in a friendly against Portugal.

Career statistics

Club

Honours
Basel
 Swiss Super League: 2016–17
 Swiss Cup winner: 2016–17 2018–19

External links

References

1997 births
People from Rheinfelden (Baden)
Sportspeople from Freiburg (region)
Footballers from Baden-Württemberg
German people of Italian descent
Living people
German footballers
Italian footballers
Italy under-21 international footballers
Association football defenders
FC Basel players
Kasımpaşa S.K. footballers
Toronto FC players
Swiss Promotion League players
Swiss Super League players
Süper Lig players
Major League Soccer players
Italian expatriate footballers
Expatriate footballers in Switzerland
Italian expatriate sportspeople in Switzerland
Expatriate footballers in Turkey
Italian expatriate sportspeople in Turkey